Abhimanam is a 1960 Indian Telugu-language drama film produced by Sundarlal Nahatha and T. Ashwadanarayana under the Sri Productions banner and directed by C. S. Rao. It stars Akkineni Nageswara Rao, Savitri,  Krishna Kumari, with music composed by Ghantasala.

Plot 
The film begins with Venu (Akkineni Nageswara Rao) a graduate, brought up with the efforts of his destitute mother Lakshmi Kanthamma (Kannamba). He falls for his classmate Radha (Savitri) and approaches her father (V. Nagayya) with his mother taking their marriage proposal. Thereupon, Radha's father insults them due to their financial status, as a result, Radha has to marry Venu against her father's wishes. Radha is unable to acclimatize to poverty and is haughty towards them. Moreover, she could not admit the dominance and derision of Venu's sister Kamala (Krishna Kumari). Meanwhile, Venu acquires a job as a bank officer and resides in the city, as Radha restricts, Lakshmi Kanthamma and Kamala stay back. At that juncture, Venu meets his childhood friend O. S. Rao (Relangi) & his Suguna (S. Varalakshmi) as neighbors. At present, Venu could not bear spendthrift Radha and becomes incapable to allocate the budget for his mother. Hence, the lenders auction their houses for debts made for Venu's education. So, helpless, Lakshmi Kanthamma and Kamala reach Venu where Radha starts humiliating them. Once, when Venu is in camp, she attributes a heist to Kamala which makes them leave the house. On the way, Lakshmi Kanthamma encounters an accident made by Kaasulu (Chalam) who shelters them, without the choice of his miserly father Singaraju Lingaraju (K. V. S. Sharma) a millionaire. Kaasulu and Kamala fall for each other. Soon after the return, Venu realizes the fact and moves in search of his family. During that time, Radha misuses his bank treasure for her false prestige. Grief-stricken Venu turns back and discovers Radha's offense when he chides and denounces her and gets arrested. Immediately, Radha seeks her father's help which he denies, but later, steps in, after perceiving the value of love and affection through Suguna. Being cognizant of the plight, Lakshmi Kanthamma attempts a theft at Lingaraju's house which Kaasulu notices. Understanding the situation, he allows the required amount. Right now, she secretly hands it over to Rao and proceeds to commit suicide, but is caught by the police. Eventually, Lingaraju identifies the theft, forcibly takes Kamala to Police Station when Kaasulu arrives, and admits the truth. By the time, Rao acquits Venu when Radha too arrives, they also learn the presence of Lakshmi Kanthamma at the station. At last, Radha pleads for pardon, and even Lingaraju repents. Finally, the movie ends on a happy note with the marriage of Kaasulu and Kamala.

Cast 
Akkineni Nageswara Rao as Venu
Savitri as Radha
Krishna Kumari as Kamala
V. Nagayya as Doctor
Relangi as O. S. Rao / Sanyasi Rao
K. V. S. Sharma as Singaraju Lingaraju
Chalam as Kasulu
Allu Ramalingaiah as Thalalu
Kannamba as Lakshmi Kanthamma
S. Varalakshmi as Suguna

Soundtrack 
The music was composed by Ghantasala.

Reception 
The Indian Express wrote, "Director C. S. Rao has ably handled his team".

References

External links 
 

1960 drama films
1960 films
1960s Telugu-language films
Films directed by C. S. Rao
Films scored by Ghantasala (musician)
Indian black-and-white films
Indian drama films